Marko Klisura (born 15 October 1992) is a Serbian professional footballer who plays as a defender for Kabel.

Mainly a left centre-back, he can also play on the right side and as a left-back in defense or as a defensive midfielder. Although a tall player, Klisura started his career as a left midfielder.

Club career
Born in Sremska Mitrovica, Klisura passed the youth school of Vojvodina. Later he played for Sloga Temerin and had short episodes with Palić, Mladenovac and Cement Beočin. Full affirmation he gained in 2013–14 season playing for ČSK Čelarevo, where he played 25 matches and scored 2 goals. After solid season with Bačka he joined Novi Pazar in summer 2015, but he left that club in a short time. At the last day of the summer 2015 transfer period, Klisura moved to Spartak Subotica, where he made his SuperLiga debut. He left the club after the end first half of 2015–16 season, after only 1 official appearance for Spartak.

In the break off-season, he returned to Bačka. Klisura scored his first SuperLiga goal on 17 May 2017, in 1–0 win over Radnik Surdulica. In late 2017, he mutually terminated a contract with Bačka and left the club. On 17 February 2018, Klisura signed with Uzbekistan Super League side Buxoro. On 19 August 2018, he joined Indian Super League franchise Mumbai City on a one-year deal. After Mumbai City, he also played for Rabotnički and Bačka once again.

On 7 February 2021, Klisura signed a contract with Bosnian Premier League club Mladost Doboj Kakanj. He made his official debut for Mladost on 28 February 2021, in a league game against Široki Brijeg.

International career
At the beginning of 2017, Klisura received a call from Serbia national team head coach, Slavoljub Muslin, for a friendly match against the United States on 29 January 2017, when he made his debut for the team.

Career statistics

Club

International

References

External links
Marko Klisura stats at utakmica.rs 

1992 births
Sportspeople from Sremska Mitrovica
Living people
Serbian footballers
Serbia international footballers
Association football defenders
Association football utility players
FK Sloga Temerin players
FK Palić players
OFK Mladenovac players
FK Cement Beočin players
FK ČSK Čelarevo players
OFK Bačka players
FK Novi Pazar players
FK Spartak Subotica players
Buxoro FK players
Mumbai City FC players
FK Rabotnički players
FK Mladost Doboj Kakanj players
FK Kabel players
Serbian First League players
Serbian SuperLiga players
Uzbekistan Super League players
Indian Super League players
Macedonian First Football League players
Premier League of Bosnia and Herzegovina players
Serbian expatriate footballers
Expatriate footballers in Uzbekistan
Serbian expatriate sportspeople in Uzbekistan
Expatriate footballers in India
Serbian expatriate sportspeople in India
Expatriate footballers in North Macedonia
Serbian expatriate sportspeople in North Macedonia
Expatriate footballers in Bosnia and Herzegovina
Serbian expatriate sportspeople in Bosnia and Herzegovina